Peter J. Goicoechea (born September 8, 1949) is an American politician serving as the Nevada State Senator from the 19th district since 2012. He previously served in the Nevada Assembly, representing the 35th district from 2002 to 2012. A member of the Republican Party, he was House Minority Leader from 2009 to 2012.

Career
Goicoechea was born in Salt Lake City and studied at Utah State University. He has owned a ranch since 1970 and also worked for many years for the Eureka County, Nevada road department. He served on the Eureka County Commission from 1987 to 2002 and then was elected to the Nevada State Assembly. He has also served as a member of the Nevada State Land Use Planning Advisory Council, the Nevada Grazing Board, and he has been the Director of the Nevada Water Resource Association. He is affiliated with the Eureka Volunteer Fire Department, E Clampus Vitus, the Humboldt River Authority, and the Nevada Rural Health Center. Goicoechea is a Catholic. He and his wife Glady are the parents of two children.

References

External links
 Project Vote Smart bio for Goicoechea

1949 births
American people of Basque descent
Politicians from Salt Lake City
Utah State University alumni
People from Eureka, Nevada
Living people
Republican Party members of the Nevada Assembly
21st-century American politicians